is a Japanese light novel series written by Mareho Kikuishi and illustrated by Tsubata Nozaki. It began publication under ASCII Media Works' Dengeki Bunko imprint in March 2021. As of December 2022, five volumes have been released. A manga adaptation, illustrated by Yoshinori Kisaragi, began serialization in Kadokawa Shoten's Young Ace magazine in June 2021. As of November 2021, the series' individual chapters have been collected into a single volume.

Media

Light novel
Written by Mareho Kikuishi and illustrated by Tsubata Nozaki, the series began publication under ASCII Media Works' Dengeki Bunko imprint on March 10, 2021. As of December 2022, five volumes have been released.

In October 2021, Yen Press announced that they licensed the series for English publication.

Volume list

Manga
A manga adaptation, illustrated by Yoshinori Kisaragi, began serialization in Young Ace on June 4, 2021. As of November 2021, the series' individual chapters have been collected into a single tankōbon volume.

At Anime Expo 2022, Yen Press announced that they also licensed the manga adaptation for English publication.

Volume list

Reception
Chiriuchi Taniguchi from Real Sound praised the main characters and their relationship, as well as the plot and setting of the series. Demelza from Anime UK News praised the story and characters, comparing the story to Psycho-Pass.

In the 2022 edition of the Kono Light Novel ga Sugoi! guidebook, the series ranked 18th in the new work category. The series won the grand prize at the 27th Dengeki Novel Prize in 2021.

References

External links
  
 

2021 Japanese novels
Anime and manga based on light novels
Dengeki Bunko
Japanese mystery novels
Japanese science fiction novels
Kadokawa Shoten manga
Light novels
Mystery anime and manga
Science fiction anime and manga
Seinen manga
Yen Press titles